Venris Kahni Bennett (born 21 December 1957) is a former Bahamian cricketer. Bennett is a right-handed batsman who was a right-arm bowler, although his style is unknown. Bennett represented the Bahamas national cricket team in 5 matches.

Bennett made his debut for the Bahamas in the 2002 ICC Americas Championship against the United States. Bennett also played for the Bahamas in the 2003/04 Americas Affiliates Championship, 2004 ICC Americas Championship and the 2006 ICC Americas Championship Division Two.

Bennett made his only Twenty20 appearance for the Bahamas against the Cayman Islands in the 1st round of the 2006 Stanford 20/20.  Bennett scored 1 run and bowled an over that cost 17 runs. This was Bennett's final appearance for the Bahamas.

References

External links
Venris Bennett at Cricinfo
Venris Bennett at CricketArchive

1957 births
Living people
Bahamian cricketers